Geo. Hall & Sons, more recently known as Hall's, was a soft drink manufacturer founded in 1849 in Marryatville, South Australia (a suburb of Adelaide) by English immigrant George Hall (1818-1881). The plant later moved to Norwood, using water from natural springs. Its most well-known product was ginger beer, popularly known as "Stonie's". After George's death, the company continued to be owned by his descendants, until it was taken over in 1972. The Hall's brand name continued until 2000.

History

Beginnings
Hall was born in Waldron, Sussex, England, on 19 March 1818. During his teenage years, He had pursued the brewing of non-alcoholic drinks as a hobby. After working as a laundryman for about 14 years in both England and France, Hall and his family decided to emigrate to the new colony of South Australia, arrived in Port Adelaide in 1849, and settled in the new village of Marryatville.

Hall started producing soda water, specialising in "Stonie" ginger beer, then sold in ceramic bottles, by 1851.

Amongst the oldest aerated water manufacturers in South Australia, in 1869 George was joined by sons Henry, Thomas and Edward in the firm, which then became known as Geo. Hall & Sons. In 1872 they moved from the Marryatville site to larger premises, a former soap and candle factory on the corner of Edward Street and the Norwood Parade, where their major competitor was W Woodroofe & Son.

By 1970, Hall & Sons produced 30,000 bottles an hour.

At the 1880 International Exhibition in London, Geo. Hall & Sons were awarded six first prizes for their aerated water and soft drinks, as reported in The South Australian Register of 30 April 1880:After George Hall's death on 24 April 1881, sons Henry and Edward took over the company, which remained family-operated for a further third and fourth generation.

20th century
During the 20th century, the company produced a range of soft drinks and cordials, including Passiona, a Cottee's product they bottled for local consumption.

In 1972, Geo. Hall and Sons was purchased by C-C Bottlers, a licensed manufacturer of Coca-Cola for South Australia, who continued producing soft drinks under the Hall's brand. C-C Bottlers was in turn purchased by Coca-Cola Amatil in 1990, who in October 2000 discontinued the Hall's name, unifying several brands under the same name, Kirks, with other acquired local bottlers.

Relaunch

It was announced on 7 November in 2020 that Halls soft drinks were making a comeback with Cameron Ballard, owner of Coffee World in South Australia, obtaining the rights to the Hall's Soft Drink name and relaunching the brand. 
It is set to be available for sale in South Australian stores by the middle of summer 2021/2022.

For the launch, Halls announced 4 original flavors would be returning; Halls Lemon Twist, Halls Fruita, Halls Lemonade and Halls Stonie Ginger Beer, with the hopes to get more original flavors back in time.

Cameron has stated he has been in contact with the original Halls family to work on the recipes for the flavors to try and replicate the original taste of the drinks.

References

Further reading

Halls
Halls
Food and drink companies established in 1849
1849 establishments in Australia